Sébastien de Chaunac (born 7 October 1977) is a retired French professional tennis player. He mainly played ATP Challenger Series tournaments, capturing one singles and two doubles titles. He has appeared in the main draw of grand slam tournaments a total of eight times.

Career

College career

Prior to turning pro, de Chaunac played three collegiate seasons (1995–98) at the University of Mississippi and was tabbed an All-American in his final two years. As a sophomore in 1996–97, he was 52–9 in singles, reached the semifinals of the 1997 NCAA Singles Championship and finished the season ranked No. 2 nationally. He also was the Southeastern Conference Tournament MVP and led the Rebels to the semifinals of the NCAA Team Championship (after Ole Miss had reached the quarterfinals in both 1996 and '97), clinching the quarterfinal victory against Boise State. As a junior in 1997–98, de Chaunac was ranked No. 1 in the nation in singles and claimed the title in the SEC Singles Championship. An all-SEC selection in his final two seasons, he helped the Rebels claim SEC regular-season titles in both 1996 and '97, as well as the tournament crown in the latter year. An outstanding student, de Chaunac was named to the GTE/CoSIDA Academic All-America First Team in 1998 and had a perfect 4.0 grade-point average.

2009
He entered the qualifications of the 2009 Australian Open ranked #252. He beat Gary Lugassy (6–4, 6–3), Alex Bogdanović (6–3, 6–2) and Santiago Ventura (6–4, 6–1) to qualify for the main draw of the Australian Open for the second time in his career after a first round appearance in 2004. In the first round proper, he defeated #57 Steve Darcis in a gruelling 5-set encounter, finally prevailing 2–6, 6–3, 0–6, 6–2, 6–2. He was then beaten in straight sets by ninth seed and World No. 10 James Blake 6–3, 6–2, 6–3.

He then qualified for the SA Tennis Open in Johannesburg. In the first round, he upset third seed Marcel Granollers 7–5, 7–6(3) then defeated local wildcard Izak van der Merwe in a hard-fought 6–7(3), 7–5, 7–6(5) victory to reach the quarter-finals of an ATP tournament for the first time since February 2005 in Marseille. There he was beaten by fellow Frenchman and eventual runner-up Jérémy Chardy 7–6(4), 6–3.

This loss marked the beginning of a period of struggle for de Chaunac, as he successively failed to qualify for the tournaments in Marseille and Indian Wells, while also recording a string of first and second-round defeats in Challenger tournaments. This period was highlighted only by a semifinal run at the Jersey Challenger in March and a final at a Futures tournament in Newcastle in May. The following week, he entered the qualifying draw for the French Open, discarding Grega Žemlja (3–6, 7–5, 7–5) and Pablo Santos (6–7(1), 6–2, 6–2), only to fall to Daniel Brands 7–6(5), 6–7(3), 10–8 in the qualifying round. He was equally unlucky at Wimbledon, losing to Alejandro Falla 6–4, 6–4, 6–4 in the last round of qualifying.

He bounced back, though, by qualifying for the next tournament in Indianapolis, where he put up a good but ultimately unsuccessful fight in the first round against Robby Ginepri, who prevailed 7–5, 5–7, 6–2, and went on to win the tournament. Two weeks later, he qualified for an ATP World Tour 500 tournament in Washington by defeating Brendan Evans 4–6, 7–6(3), 7–6(4). He beat Denis Istomin 6–4, 7–6(7) in the first round, before stunning fourteenth seed and World No. 32 Dmitry Tursunov 3–6, 7–6(3), 7–5, the highest-ranked player he ever managed to beat. Unfortunately, his run was cut short by American John Isner, who ousted him 6–2, 6–4 in the next round. As a result, he reached a new career-high, integrating the Top 150 for the first time. However, he failed to qualify for the US Open, losing to Marsel İlhan 7–6(4), 7–6(6) in the second round of qualifying.

A few weeks later, he qualified for yet another ATP-level tournament, his fifth of the year, in Metz, by beating Alex Bogdanović 6–1, 1–6, 7–6(7). In the first round, he pushed Ivan Ljubičić to a final-set tie-break, losing 4–6, 6–1, 7–6(1). His efforts were rewarded by a new career-high ranking of World No. 140.

Personal life
He is the son of former racing car driver and founder of Oreca Team Hugues de Chaunac. He allegedly  is married and has three children.

Singles finals

Wins (5)

Runners-up (9)

Doubles titles

Wins (3)

Runners-up (1)

References

External links
 
 
 de Chaunac World ranking history

1977 births
Living people
French male tennis players
Sportspeople from Aix-en-Provence
People from Nevers
Sportspeople from Nièvre
Ole Miss Rebels men's tennis players